Hedera rhombea, the Japanese ivy or songak, is a species of ivy in the Araliaceae family native to East Asia. Formerly named Hedera pedunculata, some subspecies could be subsequently classified as a distinct species. It is common on rocky slopes and growing up the trunks of trees, especially in laurel forest, a type of cloud forest.

Hedera rhombea is found in Japan, the Korean Peninsula, islands between Korea and Japan, the coast of mainland China and Taiwan. It is an evergreen climbing plant, growing to 10 m high where suitable surfaces (trees, cliffs, walls) are available, and also growing as ground cover where there are no vertical surfaces. It climbs by means of aerial rootlets which cling to the substrate. Stems are green, poisonous if eaten and have an irritating sap. It is cultivated in gardens and used in floral arrangements.

The leaves are medium green and have a rhombic diamond shape that give it its species name, rhombea. Leaves have a glossy, dark green petiole. The bisexual flowers are 4–5 mm in diameter and yellow-green, in erect umbels. The round fruits are black when ripe.

References 

thombea
Medicinal plants of Asia
Garden plants